Faggo is a town in Bauchi State, Nigeria.

Geography
It is located 35 km southwest of Azare and 7 km northeast of Foggo.

References

Populated places in Bauchi State